Conspiracy of Silence is a British drama film set in Ireland and inspired by real events. The film challenges celibacy and its implication for the Catholic Church in the 21st century.

Written and directed by John Deery, the cast includes: Academy Award-winner Brenda Fricker, Hugh Bonneville, Chris O'Dowd, John Lynch, Jonathan Forbes, Jason Barry, Sean McGinley, Fintan McKeown, Jim Norton and Hugh Quarshie.

The movie won many international awards including the U.S. National Board of Review of Motion Pictures' Freedom of Expression Award in 2004, which it shared with Michael Moore's Fahrenheit 9/11 and Mel Gibson's The Passion of the Christ. Deery was also nominated for Best Film Director at the Irish Film Awards in 2003. The screenplay was developed at the Sundance Screenwriters' Lab in Utah and won the Hartley-Merrill International Screenwriting Award presented to Deery at the Cannes Film Festival in 2001.

The film was invited to be shown at many film festivals in 2003 to be in Competition and/or Official Selection including: Taormina, Italy (first public screening, June 2003), Moscow International Film Festival, Opening Night film at the Galway Film Festival, Ireland, Montreal Film Festival, Hamburg Film Festival, Warsaw Film Festival where it won a Special Jury Award, Dinard Festival of British Cinema, France, and the American Film Institute (AFI) Festival in Los Angeles. It received an art house release in the United States but, so far, has not been released in the UK.

Plot
Father Sweeney (Patrick Casey), a gay Catholic priest living with HIV, commits suicide. His death leads local investigative journalist David Foley (Jason Barry) to write a story that publicly identifies Sweeney as having HIV.

At the local seminary, two students near ordination are expelled because one, Daniel (Jonathon Forbes) was seen leaving the room of the other, Niall (Paudge Behan). Niall is gay and Daniel is straight and they engaged in no sexual activity but were still expelled for the sake of appearances. Daniel returns home, where he is torn between his calling to the priesthood and his love for his ex-girlfriend Sinead (Catherine Walker).

Daniel meets with Foley, who writes a follow-up article exposing a covered-up AIDS protest that Sweeney had staged at the Vatican three years earlier and Daniel's dismissal. He also alleges that cardinals close to the Pope are engaged in sexual relationships and calls on the Church to re-examine its celibacy requirement for priests. The local bishop, Michael Quinn (Jim Norton), pressures the editor of the local paper not to run the second story. The editor acquiesces but after reading the story sends it to the Irish Times, which prints it.

The next day the bishop, his aide, Foley and Daniel appear together in a live television debate. Before the broadcast, agents of the Church threaten to harm Foley's family unless he retracts his story on the air. Bishop Quinn offers to reinstate Daniel if Daniel is willing to admit he has been wrong. On-air Foley capitulates but Daniel does not, asking the bishop if he himself practices celibacy. When the bishop refuses to answer, Father Sweeney's partner, former priest Matthew Francis (John Lynch) confronts Quinn with Sweeney's suicide note in which Sweeney discloses that Quinn and he had had an affair.

At film's end, Daniel is back at home with Sinead.

Cast
Jonathan Forbes ... Daniel McLaughlin
Hugh Bonneville ...  Fr. Jack Dowling 
Brenda Fricker ...  Annie McLaughlin 
Seán McGinley ...  Fr. Rector Cathal 
Hugh Quarshie ...  Fr. Joseph Ennis, S.J. 
Jason Barry ...  David Foley 
Paudge Behan ...  Niall 
Sean Boru ...  Father Murphy 
Olivia Caffrey ...  Liz Foley 
Tommy Carey ...  Sean 
Padraig O'Loinsigh (as Patrick Lynch) ...  Fr. Frank Sweeney 
Carmel Cryan ...  Mrs. McDermott 
Catherine Cusack ...  Mary McLaughlin 
Patrick Doyle ...  Senior Umpire #1 
Patrick Duggan ...  Micky 
Christopher Dunne ...  Fr. Martin Hennessy 
Jim Dunne ...  Senior Umpire #2 
James Ellis ...  Jim O'Brien 
Anna Rose Fullen ...  Martha 
Jim Howlin ...  Team Manager 
Jason Kavanagh ...  Liam 
Sinead Keenan ...  Majella 
John Lynch ...  Fr. Matthew Francis 
Edward MacLiam ...  Fitzpatrick 
Owen McDonnell ...  Noel 
Fintan McKeown ...  Monsignor Thomas 
Kevin McMahon ...  Donal 
Brendan McNamara ...  Declan 
Justine Mitchell ...  Assistant Floor Manager 
Ciaran Murtagh ...  Michael 
Jim Norton ...  Bishop Michael Quinn 
Niall O'Brien ...  John 
Chris O'Dowd ...  James 
Aidan O'Hara ...  Paul 
Lillian Patton ...  Molly 
Sid Rainey ...  Joe 
Phil Roache ...  Supporter 
Fergal Spelman ...  TV Director 
Elaine Symons ...  Marie 
Harry Towb ...  Father Doherty 
Catherine Walker ...  Sinead 
Nuala Walsh ...  Mrs. McGlynn

Release
The film got a limited US theatrical release in December 2004, following its festival screenings.

2014 re-release
The film was re-launched at the Berlin International Film Festival in February 2014 by a new US boutique sales company, Angel Grace Productions, headed by Michael Fister.

Reception

Critical repsonse

Awards and nominations

References

External links
 
 Official website - Angel Grace Productions
 
 

2003 films
2003 drama films
2003 independent films
English-language Irish films
British independent films
Irish independent films
Films critical of the Catholic Church
British LGBT-related films
Irish LGBT-related films
Films about LGBT and Christianity
HIV/AIDS in British films
2000s English-language films
2000s British films